Hanzel is a surname and a given name. Notable people with the name include:

Surname 
Ľuboš Hanzel (born 1987), Slovak footballer 
Łukasz Hanzel (born 1986), Polish footballer
Milan Hanzel (1994–1994), Government ministers of Slovakia
Tomáš Hanzel (born  1989), Slovak football defender

Given name 
Hanzel Martínez (born 1991), Mexican professional boxer

See also 
Hanzel und Gretyl, an American industrial metal band
Hansel (disambiguation)

Surnames from given names